Ramon Berenguer IV (Anglicized Raymond Berengar) was the name of two medieval rulers:
Ramon Berenguer IV, Count of Barcelona (–1162)
Ramon Berenguer IV, Count of Provence (1198–1245)

pt:Ramón Berenguer IV